Vicente Ferre (b. at Valencia, Spain; d. at Salamanca in 1682) was a Spanish Dominican theologian, a leading Thomist of his time.

Life

He entered the Dominican Order at Salamanca, where he pursued his studies in the Dominican College of St. Stephen. After teaching in several houses of study of his order in Spain, he was called from Burgos to Rome, where for eighteen years he was regens primarius of the Dominican College of St. Thomas, the future Pontifical University of Saint Thomas Aquinas, Angelicum.

From Rome he went to Salamanca, where he became prior of the convent and, after three years, regent of studies.

Works

He died while publishing his commentaries on the Summa Theologica of Thomas Aquinas. We have two folio volumes on the Secunda Secundae, covering the treatises of faith, hope, and charity, and the opposite vices. Published at Rome in 1669; three on the Prima, published at Salamanca, in 1675, 1676, and 1678 respectively; and three on the Prima Secundae, down to Q. cxiii, published at Salamanca, 1679, 1681, and 1690. His confrère Pérez à Lerma added to Q. cxiv the treatise on merit.

References

Attribution
 The entry cites:
Quétif and Échard, Script. Ord. Praed., II, 696; 
Nicolas Antonio, Bibliotheca Hisp. Nova (Madrid, 1783), II, 261.

1682 deaths
Spanish Dominicans
17th-century Spanish Roman Catholic theologians
Year of birth unknown
University of Salamanca alumni